The Great Warrior Skanderbeg is a 1953 Soviet-Albanian biopic directed by Sergei Yutkevich. It was entered into the 1954 Cannes Film Festival where it earned the International Prize. Yutkevich also earned the Special Mention award for his direction.

The film is a biography of George Kastriot Skanderbeg (1405–1468), widely known as Skanderbeg, a 15th-century Albanian lord who defended his land against the Ottoman Empire for more than two decades.

In 2012, for the 100th anniversary of Albanian independence, the film was remastered for high definition with new voices, music, and sound effects.

Cast
 Akaki Khorava as Gjergj Kastrioti / Skanderbeg (dubbed in Albanian by Lec Bushati)
 Nikolai Timofeyev as Italian poet
 Vladimir Solovyov as Franciscan friar
 Boris Tenin as Din
 Besa Imami as Donika Kastrioti
 Adivie Alibali as Mamica
 Naim Frashëri as Pal Muzaka
 Oleg Zhakov as Tanush Thopia
 Sergo Zakariadze as Laonikus
 Vladimir Belokurov as Đurađ Branković, Serbian King
 Sergei Kurilov as Lekë Zaharia
 Semyon Sokolovsky as Hamza Kastrioti
 Veriko Anjaparidze as Dafina (Voisava Kastrioti)
 Georgy Chernovolenko as Marash
 Alexander Vertinsky as Francesco Foscari, Doge of Venice
 Georgy Rumyantsev as Lekë Dukagjini
 Marie Logoreci as countess
 Vahram Papazian as Murad II (voiced by Yakov Belenky)
 Nodar Şaşıqoğlu as Mehmed II
 Yury Yakovlev as warrior

References

External links

1950s biographical drama films
1950s historical drama films
1950s multilingual films
1953 drama films
1953 films
Albanian historical drama films
Albanian-language films
Albania–Soviet Union relations
Biographical action films
Cultural depictions of Skanderbeg
Films directed by Sergei Yutkevich
Films scored by Georgy Sviridov
Films set in the 15th century
Russian epic films
Russian biographical drama films
Russian historical drama films
Soviet biographical drama films
Soviet epic films
Soviet historical drama films
Soviet multilingual films
War epic films
Albanian war films
Soviet war films